The FIS Alpine World Ski Championships 1935 in alpine skiing were the fifth edition of the competition, organized by the International Ski Federation (FIS), and held in Mürren, Switzerland in February 1935.

Medal summary

Men's events

Women's events

Medal table

References

1935 in alpine skiing
1935 in Swiss sport
1935
International sports competitions hosted by Switzerland
Alpine skiing competitions in Switzerland
February 1935 sports events